The Colored American published in Augusta, Georgia from October 1865 to February 1866. It was the first African American newspaper in the South.  The paper was founded by John T. Shuften, who was forced to sell the paper within six months due to a lack of financial support.  The paper was published by John T. Shapiro.  The Colored American covered political, religious, and general news.  Shuften published the newspaper with assistance from James D. Lynch.  The paper was purchased in January 1866 by the Georgia Equal Rights Association, and the name was changed to the Loyal Georgian, published by John Emory Bryant.

References

External links 

Defunct newspapers published in Georgia (U.S. state)
Companies based in Athens, Georgia
Newspapers established in 1865
Publications disestablished in 1866
Defunct African-American newspapers
Defunct weekly newspapers
1865 establishments in Georgia (U.S. state)
1866 disestablishments in Georgia (U.S. state)